Norrmalm is a borough (stadsdelsområde) in central Stockholm, Sweden. It is named after the dominating district.

Overview
Except Norrmalm (proper) there are two districts in the borough: Skeppsholmen and  Vasastaden. A portion of northern Östermalm is also organized in Norrmalm borough. The population  is 61,905 on an area of 4.95 km², which gives a density of 12,506.06/km². The most populous district is Vasastaden.

References

External links

Boroughs of Stockholm